Apple Valley High School (AVHS) is a public four-year high school located in Apple Valley, California, United States. It is a part of the Apple Valley Unified School District. Built in 1967, it was the only comprehensive high school in the Town of Apple Valley until 1999 when Granite Hills High School opened. The campus has expanded with growth and was modernized with local bond funds in 2002.

Along with academic and co-curricular offerings, students have access to the more traditional school program of clubs, student government and sports.

Mascot
The school's mascot, Sparky the SunDevil, has been the center of controversy for many years.  Over the history of the school, the character of the SunDevil has increasingly become more cartoon-like, as parents were upset with the Satanic references.

Athletics
In football, the Sun Devils compete annually against the Victor Valley High School Jackrabbits in the "Bell Game".  The Bell game has been played since 1969 and as of 2010 Apple Valley led the overall series 27-14. Apple Valley has won 10 straight Bell Games since 2010.

Alumni
Jason Thompson (baseball player)
Jason Vargas (baseball player)
Cuba Gooding Jr. (actor)
Napoleon D'umo (choreographer, creative director)
Erik Robertson (football player)
Chris Brymer (football player)

Groups and Clubs
Apple Valley High School offers many groups and clubs including: Interact, National Honor Society, Spanish club, French club, Band, Choir, Drama, Servants of Our Savior, Junior Statesmen of America, Mock Trial, AVID, ASB (which also has ASB Tech & Audio), Trident Yearbook, The Sundial, Bowling, ping pong, Foundations, Cheer, Football, Soccer, Track, Volleyball, Basketball, Break dance, ballroom dancing, SkillsUSA, HOSA, Tennis, Auto Shop, Weight Lifting, CAMP, Graphic Communications, Language Club and more.

FFA is a group supporting agricultural education. On campus students have an assortment of animals. Pigs, steers, chickens, and lambs are raised on campus or at home by most students as their class project. Most animals are then sold at the San Bernardino County Fair in May.

The Apple Valley High School Marching Sundevils Band has performed at the National Invitational Music Festival, held at Orchestra Hall in Chicago, and has represented the community in the California State Marching Band Championships four times, in 2008, 2009, 2010, and 2011.

The Sundial is the school's student newspaper and has been a member of The Quill and Scroll International Honor Society since 1967.

HOSA is a small learning community program that is designed to teach students about health care. Students in this program prepare for careers in the medical field as well as attend national conventions. HOSA students wear surgical scrubs on campus each Wednesday.

LEAD Academy is a small learning community focused on leadership.

AFJROTC is one of the programs offered.

References

External links
Official website of Apple Valley High School
Apple Valley High School Statistics

High schools in San Bernardino County, California
Educational institutions established in 1967
Public high schools in California
1967 establishments in California